David Hala (Born 25 October 1989) is a Tonga international rugby league footballer who plays for the Redcliffe Dolphins in the Queensland Cup. He previously played for the Brisbane Broncos and the Gold Coast Titans in the NRL. He made his NRL debut in round 21 of the 2009 NRL season. 

He was recorded as the Broncos strongest ever player bench pressing a new record of 187 kg, the previous being Brad Thorn's 175 kg.

Background
Hala was born in Redcliffe, Queensland, Australia. He is of Tongan descent.

Playing career
Hala played his junior rugby league for the Redcliffe Dolphins, before he was signed by the Sydney Roosters for an $80,000 contract.

2008
In 2008, Hala played for the Sydney Roosters under-20s team.

2009
In 2009, Hala played for the Brisbane Broncos under-20s team. Whilst playing for the under-20s team he then was selected to make his debut against the Canberra Raiders in a 0-56 loss to Canberra in round 21. He played one game in 2009 in the NRL from the bench.

2010
In 2010, Hala played for the Redcliffe Dolphins before he suffered a season-ending injury he did not play first grade the whole of the 2010 season.

2011
In 2011, Hala started the year playing for the Redcliffe Dolphins then, in round 9, he got selected to play first grade for the Brisbane Broncos in the round nine clash against the Melbourne Storm and in round 15, he scored his first NRL career try, against the St George Illawarra Dragons. He played 15 games all off the bench in 2011 for a try and also played in the 3 finals games for the Brisbane Broncos.

2012
In 2012, Hala started the year injured and, in round 12, he played against the Melbourne Storm from the interchange bench and suffered a season-ending knee injury. He played one game in 2012, that game was from the interchange bench.

2013
In 2013, Hala played every game for the Broncos from round 5, against the Gold Coast Titans, until round 18, against the Cronulla-Sutherland Sharks, where he injured his shoulder and was forced to have surgery. He played 13 games in 2013 12 from the bench and started once against the Cronulla-Sutherland Sharks.

Hala was selected for Tonga as 18th man in the Pacific Rugby League International against Samoa in 2013. But due to a late injury to Nafe Seluini, he was added to the bench.

2014
In 2014, Hala played for both Broncos and Redcliffe throughout the season. He played in rounds 3, 9-11, 15-16 and 18 for the Broncos that year. He scored two tries for the Broncos against the Cronulla-Sutherland Sharks when he left the field Brisbane were leading 22-0 and then went on to lose 22-24. On 29 October 2014, he was released from his contract with the Broncos. On 3 November 2014, he signed with the Gold Coast Titans on a two-year contract starting in 2015.

2015
In round 22, Hala made his Gold Coast debut in the Titans' 36-14 loss to the Melbourne Storm. Hala made one further appearance for the Gold Coast as the club finished 14th on the table.

2016
He left the Gold Coast in July 2016, re-joining the Redcliffe Dolphins.

References

External links
Broncos Profile

1989 births
Living people
Australian sportspeople of Tongan descent
Australian rugby league players
Brisbane Broncos players
Burleigh Bears players
Gold Coast Titans players
Redcliffe Dolphins players
Rugby league players from Queensland
Rugby league props
Tonga national rugby league team players